Stilwell or Stillwell may refer to:

People
 Arthur Stilwell (1859–1928), Kansas City Southern Railway founder
 Bill Stilwell, Author and naturalist, author of three national best-sellers
 Frank Stilwell (1856–1882), Old West outlaw
 Frank Stilwell (born 1945), Australian political economist
 G. R. Stilwell, of the Ives–Stilwell experiment
 Heather Stilwell (1944–2010), school trustee in Surrey, British Columbia
 John Stillwell (born 1942), Australian mathematician
 Joseph Stilwell (1883–1946), U.S. Army four-star general
 Joseph Warren Stilwell Jr. (1912–1966), U.S. Army general, son of Joseph Stilwell
 Lewis B. Stillwell (1863–1941), an American electrical engineer and the president of AIEE from 1909 to 1910
 Michelle Stilwell (born 1974), a Canadian wheelchair racer and politician
 Natasha Stillwell, Canadian TV producer and Daily Planet and former co-host
 Richard G. Stilwell (1917–1991), U.S. Army general
 Silas M. Stilwell (1800–1881), American politician who sat in the Tennessee, Virginia and New York legislatures
 Simpson E. Stilwell (1850–1903), Indian fighter, U.S. Army scout, judge
 Stephen J. Stilwell (1866–1942), New York politician

Places
In the United States:
 Stillwell, Indiana, an unincorporated place
 Stilwell, Kansas, an unincorporated township
 Stilwell, Oklahoma, a city
 Stilwells, a former hamlet in Readington Township, New Jersey
 Stillwell Avenue, a major avenue in southern Brooklyn

Fictional characters 
 James Stillwell, the antagonist leader of Vought-American/Vought International in the comic book series The Boys
 Madelyn Stillwell, one of two characters adapted from Stillwell in the Amazon Prime Video series The Boys
 Theodore "Teddy" Stillwell, the Compound V-infused teleporting biologoical "Supe" son of Stillwell
 Mr. Stan Edgar, one of two characters adapted from Stillwell in the Amazon Prime Video series The Boys

Entertainment
 StillWell, a hard rock band